Šarani may refer to:

 Šarani (Gornji Milanovac), a village in the municipality of Gornji Milanovac, Serbia
 , a village in the municipality of Trebinje, Republika Srpska, Bosnia and Herzegovina

See also 
 Sarani (disambiguation)